Experiments in the Revival of Organisms is a 1940 motion picture directed by David Yashin which documents Soviet research into the resuscitation of clinically dead organisms.  

The heart-lung machine demonstrated in the film, the autojektor, was designed and constructed by Sergei Brukhonenko, whose work in the film is said to have led to the first operations on heart valves. The autojektor device demonstrated in the film is similar to modern ECMO machines, as well as the systems commonly used for renal dialysis in modern nephrology.

Synopsis

The film depicts and discusses a series of medical experiments. The English version of the film begins with British scientist J. B. S. Haldane appearing and discussing how he has personally seen the procedures carried out in the film and have saved lives during the war. The Russian version lacks this explanation. The experiments start with a heart of a canine, which is shown being isolated from a body; four tubes are then connected to the organ. Using an apparatus to supply it with blood, the heart beats in the same manner as if it were in a living organism. The film then shows a lung in a tray, which is operated by bellows that oxygenate the blood.

Following the lung scene, the audience is then shown the autojektor, a heart-lung machine, composed of a pair of linear diaphragm pumps, venous and arterial, exchanging oxygen with a water reservoir. It is then seen supplying a dog's head with oxygenated blood. The head is presented with external stimuli, which it responds to. Finally, a dog is brought to clinical death (depicted primarily through an animated diagram of lung and heart activity) by draining the blood from its body, triggering cardiac arrest. It is then left for ten minutes and connected to the heart-lung machine, which gradually returns the blood into the animal's circulation. After several minutes, the heart fibrillates, then restarts a normal rhythm. Respiration likewise resumes and the machine is disconnected. Over the ensuing ten days, the dog recovers from the procedure and continues living a healthy life. According to the film, several dogs were brought back to life using this method, including one which is an offspring of parents who were both also resuscitated.

Production 
The film was shot at the Institute of Experimental Physiology and Therapy, in Moscow. The operations are credited to Doctor Sergei Brukhonenko and Boris Levinskovsky, who were demonstrating a special heart-lung apparatus called the autojektor, also referred to as the heart-lung machine, to the Second Congress of Russian Pathologists in Moscow.

Reaction

The film was shown to an audience of a thousand US scientists in 1943 in the Congress of American-Soviet Friendship. The audience considered that the film "might move many supposed biological impossibilities into the realm of the possible."

Brukhonenko's decapitation experiment was remarked upon by George Bernard Shaw, who stated, "I am even tempted to have my own head cut off so that I can continue to dictate plays and books without being bothered by illness, without having to dress and undress, without having to eat, without having anything else to do other than to produce masterpieces of dramatic art and literature."

Brukhonenko developed a new version of the autojektor for use on human patients in the same year; it can be seen today on display at the Museum of Cardiovascular Surgery at the Bakulev Scientific Center of Cardiovascular Surgery in Russia. Brukhonenko was posthumously awarded the prestigious Lenin Prize.

Some commentators have questioned the film's authenticity, given that none of the more dubious experiments are shown in any full-frame shots. According to some scientists who claim to have seen the experiments in the film, the severed dog head only survived for a few minutes when attached to the artificial heart, as opposed to the hours claimed in the film. Another source of skepticism are the dogs drained of blood and then brought back to life, as after 10 minutes of death they should have experienced serious brain damage. According to the institute’s records, the dogs only survived for a few days, not several years as the film claimed.

In popular culture
 In 2004 MF Doom released his song "Fall Back / Titty Fat" (through his album Venomous Villain) which begins and ends with excerpts from the experiment. The music video for the song largely consists of segments from the 1940 motion picture.
 In 2009, the band The Paper Chase used portions of the film in their video "What Should We Do with Your Body? (The Lightning)".
 A portion of the plot of James Rollins' novel Bloodline is based on this experiment.
 The 1945 novel That Hideous Strength by C. S. Lewis makes reference to the experiments.
 Polish poet Wisława Szymborska references the experiment in her poem "The Experiment" circa 1967.
 Metallica's video for their song "All Nightmare Long" is partially based on the film, and shows Soviet scientists reanimating a dead cat.
 In the video game Team Fortress 2, a cosmetic set for the Medic called “Canis Ex Machina” features a white dog’s head, in reference to the experiment seen in the film.
 In Roald Dahl's 1960 short story "William and Mary", a doctor says: "I saw a short medical film that had been brought over from Russia. It was a rather gruesome thing, but interesting. It showed a dog's head completely severed from the body, but with the normal blood supply being maintained through the arteries and veins by means of an artificial heart."
 According to Neil Cicierega in the audio commentary for the 2016 Lemon Demon album Spirit Phone, the first track on the album ("Lifetime Achievement Award") was originally titled "Experiments in the Revival", in reference to this film.
Clips from the film were used as a part of the Youtube webseries Marble Hornets.

See also
 List of films in the public domain in the United States
 Suspended animation
 Research ethics

References

External links 
 
 
 
 
 
  The Autojektor on display at the Scientific Center of Cardiovascular Surgery (in Russian) (via Wayback Machine)
 A medical paper on Brukhonenko's work (in Russian, requires PubMed access)
 Brukhonenko excerpt from "The Golden Book of Russia. The Year 2000"

1940 films
Soviet black-and-white films
Forteana
Soviet documentary films
1940 documentary films
Black-and-white documentary films
Articles containing video clips
Films shot in Moscow
Animal testing in the Soviet Union